The puffbirds and their relatives in the near passerine family Bucconidae are tropical tree-dwelling insectivorous birds that are found from South America up to Mexico. Together with their closest relatives, the jacamars, they form a divergent lineage within the order Piciformes, though the two families are sometimes elevated to a separate order Galbuliformes. Lacking the iridescent colours of the jacamars, puffbirds are mainly brown, rufous or grey, with large heads, large eyes, and flattened bills with a hooked tip. Their loose, abundant plumage and short tails makes them look stout and puffy, giving rise to the English name of the family.

Taxonomy and naming
Puffbirds get their common name from their fluffy plumage. In Spanish, they have been nicknamed bobo ("dummy") from their propensity to sit motionless waiting for prey. American naturalist Thomas Horsfield defined the Bucconidae in 1821. The family was classified as part of the Piciformes by Alexander Wetmore in his work A Systematic Classification for the Birds of the World (1930, revised in 1951 and 1960). The placement of the combined puffbird and jacamar lineage was in question, with some bone and muscle features suggesting they may be more closely related to the Coraciiformes. However, analysis of nuclear DNA in a 2003 study placed them as sister group to the rest of the Piciformes, also showing that the groups had developed zygodactyl feet (two toes facing forward and two aft) before separating. Per Ericson and colleagues, in analysing genomic DNA, confirmed that puffbirds and jacamars were sister groups and their place in Piciformes. The lineage is sometimes elevated to order level as Galbuliformes, first proposed by Sibley and Ahlquist in 1990.

Molecular investigation of the Bucconidae in 2004 indicated that the nunlets (genus Nonnula) diverged from the common ancestor of other puffbirds an estimated 25 million years ago, with the genus Malacoptila the next to branch off around 19.1 million years ago. A fossil right wing recovered from Lower Eocene beds in Lincoln County Wyoming was initially classified as a puffbird and given the name Primobucco mcgrewi. However, the discovery of more complete specimens, including twelve in 2010, has indicated that Primobucco was instead an early type of roller.

Distribution and habitat
Puffbirds are found from Mexico to southern Brazil, with the greatest variety of species found in the Amazon Basin. They live in forested or wooded habitats, including lowland, foothills, and open woodland. The white-faced nunbird is the only member of this species known to live in highlands. The swallow-winged puffbird also lives in more open country. No species of puffbirds have been recorded of moving any significant distance beyond its home territory.

Description
Generally dull-plumaged birds, puffbirds may have brightly colored bills, eyebrows and irises. They have large heads, short wings and strong bills, with short legs and diminutive feet. There is some sexual dimorphism; the female is slightly larger and slightly duller-plumaged than the male. Juvenile birds have shorter beaks.

Voice 
Puffbirds are one of the most silent birds in the Neotropics and vocalize very rarely. The most vocal species are the nunbirds and those in the genus  Nystalus. When calling they mostly do so at dawn and dusk. The main vocalizations consist of repeated and high-pitched whistles. The nunbirds are the most vocal of the family; they have a wide repertoire of calls and often give very loud shouts.

Behavior 
Puffbirds are by nature arboreal. Mostly secretive, they are  found singly or in small family groups. Species of the genus Monasa, known as nunbirds, are more gregarious and found in flocks.

Feeding
Puffbirds are sit-and-wait hunters, perching unmoving for long periods, while watching for insect prey. As well as arthropods, they may eat small lizards and plant material. Arthropod exoskeletons are regurgitated as pellets.  The swallow-winged puffbird is the only member in the family that is known to capture insects from open perches.

Breeding 
The breeding behaviour of puffbirds is not well known. Nests are burrows in dirt, rotten wood or termite mounds. Puffbirds are known to lay clutches of two or three eggs. The eggs are round, small, and white. The incubation period is around 15 days, and performed by both parents. Born blind and naked, the young can crawl to the entrance of the nest burrow at one or two days of age. There, their mother feeds them partly chewed insects. They fledge at around 20 to 21 days.

Species

References

 Stiles and Skutch, A guide to the birds of Costa Rica

External links

Internet Bird Collection.com: Puffbird−Bucconidae videos

 
.
Birds of Central America
Birds of South America
Taxa named by Thomas Horsfield